The Platino Award for Best Supporting Actor (Spanish: Premio Platino al mejor actor de reparto/Premio Platino a la mejor interpretación masculina de reparto) is one of the Platino Awards, Ibero-America's film awards presented annually by the Entidad de Gestión de Derechos de los Productores Audiovisuales (EGEDA) and the Federación Iberoamericana de Productores Cinematográficos y Audiovisuales (FIPCA). 

It was first presented in 2021, with Chilean actor Alfredo Castro being the first recipient, for his role at "The Stallion" in The Prince. Prior to that, supporting male performances were included in the Best Actor category. Alfredo Castro is also the only winner of the category to date, receiving the award two years in a row.

In the list below the winner of the award for each year is shown first, followed by the other nominees.

Winners and nominees

2020s

See also
 Goya Award for Best Supporting Actor

References

External links
Official site

Platino Awards
Awards established in 2021